"Stay with Me Tonight" is a song by British synthpop group the Human League, released in January 1996 as a single from their second compilation album, Greatest Hits (1995). It was jointly written by Philip Oakey and producer Ian Stanley, features lead vocals by Oakey; with backing by co-vocalists Susan Ann Sulley and Joanne Catherall. Post production by re-mixers 'Space Kittens'.

Background
"Stay With Me Tonight" was recorded at HL Studios in Sheffield during 1995. It was released as a single in the UK on 8 January 1996 by EastWest Records, where it reached number 40 in the UK singles chart remaining there for 2 weeks. The track is the only exclusive track on the Virgin Records Human League Greatest Hits compilation album (1995 version).

Lyrically the song is (another) story by Oakey about being left by a girlfriend, and is written about their last night together.

Critical reception
It was critically well received, but was not heavily promoted and did not sell in large enough quantities to make any impact on the charts.

Music Week rated the song three out of five, adding that "The League are on a roll, but this frenetic new offering written for their Greatest Hits package works best in its ponding club mixes." A reviewer from Muzik magazine commented, "The League have gone for it big time with this pounding nu-energy epic, remixed by The Space Kittens. It’s a towering slice of disco drama with Phil Oakey – the first Sheffield sex god – sounding wild’n’windswept while his gloomy female sidekicks chirp wistfully in the background. If there is a New Romantic revival then who better to benefit than the League, who started it all off originally." James Hamilton from the RM Dance Update described it as "bin shaking dynamite for megawatt speaker".

Music video
No official music video was ever recorded or released for "Stay With Me Tonight". However, in 1997 producer John Von Ahlen of Subterrane Recording Studio created an unofficial video that was distributed on the internet. The Von Ahlen video utilized animated stills using 3dfx and Version 4.2 of Adobe Premiere. It has now become the de facto music video for the track.

Track listings
 12" vinyl
A1 "Stay With Me Tonight" (Biff & Memphis Remix) 6:45
A2 "Stay With Me Tonight" (Space Kittens Vocal Mix) 8:35
B1 "Stay With Me Tonight" (Biff & Memphis Dub Mix) 6:46 
B2 "Stay With Me Tonight" (Space Kittens Future Dub) 9:01

 CD single
01 "Stay With Me Tonight" 4:00
02 "Stay With Me Tonight" (Space Kittens Vocal Mix) 8:35

 CD maxi
01 "Stay With Me Tonight" (Space Kittens Vocal Mix) 8:35 
02 "Stay With Me Tonight" (Space Kittens Future Dub) 9:01 
03 "Stay With Me Tonight" (Biff & Memphis Remix) 6:45
04 "Stay With Me Tonight" (Biff & Memphis Dub) 6:46

Charts

References

External links
 http://www.the-black-hit-of-space.dk/stay_with_me_tonight.htm
 Unofficial Human League Biography

1996 singles
1995 songs
The Human League songs
Songs written by Philip Oakey
Songs written by Ian Stanley
Song recordings produced by Ian Stanley
East West Records singles